Clodine is an unincorporated community in Fort Bend County, Texas, United States, between the Alief section of Houston and the city of Fulshear.

History 
Clodine was first established in the 1880s as a station on the San Antonio and Aransas Pass Railway.  Clodine had acquired a Post Office by 1893. In 1896 the town had a general store, a Baptist church, and a population of fifty.  Clodine acquired a Community School in the year 1897.  By 1914 Clodine had telephone and telegraph connections, and a population of twenty-five.  The Texas and New Orleans Railroad bought the San Antonio and Aransas Pass line in 1934 and removed the depot and section houses.  In 1936 the town had gained a factory and several businesses. In 1947 Clodine had a population of fifty and was a shipping point for surrounding farms and a local oil field. In 1990 Clodine had around 31 residents.
In 2001 George Bush High School opened. In the early 2003 the rail road was taken up to make way for the Westpark Tollway.   In 2005 the Westpark Tollway was constructed on the former railroad right of way. A shopping center was built near the tollway on FM 1093. In April 2008 the Clodine General Store was moved to make room for the expansion of Farm to Market Road 1464.

Education 
Clodine is within the Fort Bend Independent School District.  It is served primarily by George Bush High School, Hodges Bend Middle School, Barbra Jordan Elementary School, and Mission West Elementary School.

References

External links 
 
 

Unincorporated communities in Texas
Unincorporated communities in Fort Bend County, Texas
Greater Houston